William James Gibb (25 June 1882 – 8 August 1952) was an Australian politician.

He was born at Redfern to tramdriver James Gibb and Julie Smith. He worked as a tailor, and was vice-president of the Amalgamated Clothing and Allied Trades' Union from 1917, becoming federal president from 1928 to 1929. On 9 December 1922 he married Elizabeth Kelly; he would later marry again on 14 April 1949 to Charlotte Dalton McMahon. He served on the Labor Party central executive from 1923 to 1924. He was a Labor member of the New South Wales Legislative Council from 1931 to 1934 and from 1943 to 1952, when he died at Darlinghurst.

References

1882 births
1952 deaths
Australian Labor Party members of the Parliament of New South Wales
Members of the New South Wales Legislative Council
20th-century Australian politicians